George Lee Andrews (born October 13, 1942, Milwaukee, Wisconsin) is an American actor and singer. He holds the Guinness World Record for the most performances in the same Broadway show, having appeared in the musical Phantom of the Opera on 9,382 occasions over a period of 23 years.

He made his Broadway debut as Frid in the original production of A Little Night Music, and later appeared in the original productions of On the Twentieth Century; Merlin, and The Phantom of the Opera, and in the revival of Evita. He returned to A Little Night Music in 1990, this time in the leading role of Frederick Egerman at the New York City Opera.

References

1942 births
20th-century American male actors
21st-century American male actors
Living people
American male musical theatre actors
Date of birth unknown
Male actors from Milwaukee